A paupiette is a piece of meat, beaten thin, and rolled with a stuffing of vegetables, fruits, or sweetmeats. It is often featured in recipes from Normandy. It is often fried or braised, or baked in wine or stock. They are very popular in France, being sold ready-prepared in supermarkets and butchers. Paupiettes can be made with various items such as chicken, beef, lamb, fish, veal, cabbage, turkey escalopes or slices of calves' sweetbreads.

A paupiette is a type of roulade and sometimes called a braciole. Paupiette may also refer to a classic French fish dish whereby a thin slice of fish (tuna, sole, whiting or even anchovy) is stuffed, rolled and secured with string before cooking in a stock.

A synonym of paupiette is, in Belgium, oiseau sans tête.

Examples of dishes featuring paupiettes
Paupiettes de Volaille Florentine, where the stuffing is spinach and prosciutto and rice.

Paupiettes of lamb à la créole, where the stuffing is pork forcemeat with onions and peppers.

Paupiettes of turkey à la crécy, where the stuffing is a pork forcemeat mixed with a dry mushroom duxelle, chopped parsley and bound with eggs.

Footnotes

References

Claiborne, C.:The New New York Times Cookbook, page 259–260. Harper & Row, 1979
Montagné, P.: New Concise Larousse Gatronomique, page 849. Hamlyn, 2007

Beef
Norman cuisine
Veal dishes